Combinado is a municipality located in the Brazilian state of Tocantins. Its population was 4,861 (2020) and its area is 210 km².

References

Municipalities in Tocantins